Winifred Mary Hunter-Brown Harper (June 28, 1872 - July 5, 1933) was an author, collaborating with her husband, Theodore Acland Harper, in writing adventure books for children.

Early life
Winifred Mary Hunter-Brown Harper was a native of Nelson, New Zealand. She was born on June 28, 1872, the daughter of Charles Brown, one of the first members of the at the time British Colony, and Ellinor Hunter.

Career
She was an author and collaborated with her husband in the following books:
 "The Mushroom Boy" (1924)
 "Singing Feathers" (1925)
 "Siberian Gold" (1927)
 "The Janitor's Cat" (1927)
 "Kubrik the Outlaw: Mining Adventures and Revolution in Far-Eastern Siberia" (1928)
 "Forgotten Gods, Adventure and mystery in Yucatan" (1929)
 "His Excellency and Peter" (1930)
 "Windy Island: A Story of Adventure in New Zealand" (1931) (inspired by Theodore Acland Harper's childhood, growing up on his family's plantation, "Ilam," at Riccarton, New Zealand).

Personal life

On November 8, 1908, she married Theodore Acland Harper (1871-1942), born into a prominent New Zealand family. Theodore Acland Harper's grandfather, Henry John Chitty Harper, was the first Bishop of Canterbury Province, his father, Leonard Harper, was the first president of the New Zealand Alpine Club. Winifred Harper lived in England, Siberia (1908), Central America (1909) and Alaska (1910), following her husband's mining jobs. 

They moved to Oregon in 1912 and lived at 625 Hoyt Street, Portland, Oregon. With her husband, they founded the "Uncle Toby's Storyhouse" at Camp Namanu, part of the Portland Area Council of Camp Fire.

She died in Portland, Oregon on July 5, 1933.

References

1933 deaths
1872 births
American women writers
Writers from Portland, Oregon
Winifred
People from Nelson, New Zealand